is a 1994 Japanese animated fantasy film written and directed by Isao Takahata, animated by Studio Ghibli for Tokuma Shoten, Nippon Television Network and Hakuhodo, and distributed by Toho.

An environmental allegory, the story features tanuki, or Japanese raccoon dogs (incorrectly referred to as "raccoons" in the English dialog).  In Japanese folklore, tanuki are considered to be magical creatures, capable of shape-shifting into people or other objects.  They are a highly sociable, mischievous species, too fun-loving and fond of tasty treats to be a real threat – unlike kitsune (foxes) and other shape-shifters.

The phrase "Pom Poko" in the title refers to the sound of tanuki drumming their bellies, from a 1919 poem by Ujō Noguchi which became a popular children's song when it was set to music in 1925.

Prominent scrotums are an integral part of tanuki folklore, and they are shown and referred to throughout the film, and also used frequently in their shape-shifting. This remains unchanged in the DVD release, though the English dub (but not the subtitles) refers to them as "raccoon pouches".

Plot
The story begins in late 1960s Japan. A group of tanuki are threatened by a gigantic suburban development project called New Tama, in the Tama Hills on the outskirts of Tokyo. The development is cutting into their forest habitat and dividing their land. The story resumes in early 1990s Japan, during the early years of the Heisei era. With limited living space and food decreasing every year, the tanuki begin fighting among themselves for the diminishing resources, but at the urging of the matriarch Oroku, they decide to unify to stop the development.

Several tanuki lead the resistance, including the aggressive chief Gonta, the old guru Seizaemon, the wise-woman Oroku, and the young and resourceful Shoukichi. Using their illusion skills (which they must re-learn after having forgotten them), they stage a number of diversions including industrial sabotage. These attacks injure and even kill people, frightening construction workers into quitting, but more workers immediately replace them. In desperation, the tanuki send out messengers to seek help from various legendary elders from other regions.

After several years, one of the messengers returns bringing a trio of elders from the distant island of Shikoku, where development is not a problem and the tanuki are still worshipped. In an effort at re-establishing respect for the supernatural, the group stages a massive ghost parade to make the humans think the town is haunted. The strain of the massive illusion kills one of the elders and his spirit is lifted up in a raigō, and the effort seems wasted when the owner of a nearby theme park takes credit for the parade, claiming it was a publicity stunt.

With this setback, the unity of the tanuki finally fails and they break up into smaller groups, each following a different strategy. One group led by Gonta takes the route of eco-terrorism, holding off workers until they are wiped out in a pitched battle with the police, and finally, fused into the form of a tsurube-otoshi, killed blocking the path of an oncoming dekotora. Another group desperately attempts to gain media attention through television appearances to plead their case against the habitat's destruction. One of the elders becomes senile and starts a Buddhist dancing cult among the tanuki who are unable to transform, eventually sailing away with them in a ship that takes them to their deaths, while the other elder investigates joining the human world as the last of the transforming kitsune (foxes) have already done.

When all else fails, in a last act of defiance, the remaining tanuki stage a grand illusion, temporarily transforming the urbanized land back into its pristine state to remind everyone of what has been lost. Finally, with their strength exhausted, the tanuki most trained in illusion follow the example of the kitsune: they blend into human society one by one, abandoning those who cannot transform. While the media appeal comes too late to stop the construction, the public responds sympathetically to the tanuki, pushing the developers to set aside some areas as parks. However, the parks are too small to accommodate all the non-transforming tanuki. Some try to survive there, dodging traffic to rummage through human scraps for food, while others disperse farther out to the countryside to compete with the tanuki who are already there.

One day, Shoukichi, who also joined the human world, is coming home from work when he sees a non-transformed tanuki leaping into a gap in a wall. Shoukichi crawls into the gap and follows the path, which leads to a grassy clearing where some of his former companions are gathering. He joyfully transforms back into a tanuki to join them. Shoukichi's friend, Ponkichi, addresses the viewer, asking humans to be more considerate of tanuki and other animals less endowed with transformation skills, and not to destroy their living space; as the view pulls out and away, their surroundings are revealed as a golf course within a suburban sprawl.

Voice cast

Additional voices in the English dub include Newell Alexander, Jeff Bennett, Mitch Carter, Holly Dorff, Zac Gardner, Sherry Hursey, Jordan Orr, Philece Sampler, Alyson Stoner, Erica Beck, Reeve Carney, David Cowgill, Ike Eisenmann, Richard Steven Horvitz, Hope Levy, Mary Mouser, Peter Renaday, Audrey Wasilewski, and Adam Wylie.

Release
The film was released in Japan on July 16, 1994. It was released on DVD on August 16, 2005 in North America by Walt Disney Studios Home Entertainment along with My Neighbors the Yamadas. Optimum Releasing released the film on DVD in the United Kingdom, a year later. Disney released a Blu-ray disc on February 3, 2015. GKIDS re-issued the film on Blu-ray and DVD on February 6, 2018 under a new deal with Studio Ghibli.

Reception
Pom Poko was the number one Japanese film on the domestic market in 1994, earning  in distribution income, and grossing  in total box office revenue.

On the review aggregator Rotten Tomatoes, the film has an approval rating of 85% based on 13 reviews. It was chosen as the Japanese submission for the Academy Award for Best Foreign Language Film for that year. It won Best Animation Film at the 49th Mainichi Film Awards.

See also
 Ponpoko, a video game featuring tanuki
 List of submissions to the 67th Academy Awards for Best Foreign Language Film
 List of Japanese submissions for the Academy Award for Best Foreign Language Film

References

External links

Pom Poko at Rotten Tomatoes

 
 
 Pom Poko at nausicaa.net // Hayao Miyazaki Web

1990s children's animated films
1994 comedy-drama films
1990s Japanese-language films
1994 anime films
1994 films
Anime with original screenplays
Annecy Cristal for a Feature Film winners
Environmental films
Fantasy anime and manga
Films about animal rights
Films about raccoons
Animated films about shapeshifting
Films based on urban legends
Films directed by Isao Takahata
Films set in Japan
Japanese mythology in anime and manga
Studio Ghibli animated films
Toho animated films
Yōkai in anime and manga